The Moby Project is a collection of public-domain lexical resources created by Grady Ward. The resources were dedicated to the public domain, and are now mirrored at Project Gutenberg. , it contains the largest free phonetic database, with 177,267 words and corresponding pronunciations.

Hyphenator 
The Moby Hyphenator II contains hyphenations of 187,175 words and phrases (including 9,752 entries where no hyphenations are given, such as through and avoir).  The character encoding appears to be MacRoman, and hyphenation is indicated by a bullet (character value 165 decimal, or A5 hexadecimal).  Some entries, however, have a combination of actual hyphens and character 165, such as "".

There is little to no documentation of the hyphenation choices made; the following examples might give some flavour of the style of hyphenation used: .

Languages 
Moby Language II contains wordlists of five languages: French, German, Italian, Japanese, and Spanish. Their statistics are:

There are also unusual peculiarities in the sorting of these lists, as the French list contains a straight alphabetical listing, while the German list contains the alphabetical listing of traditionally capitalized words and then the alphabetical listing of traditionally lower-cased words. The list of Italian words, however, contains no capitalized words whatsoever.

The lists do not use accented characters, so "" is how a user would look up the French word  ("to be").

 Part-of-Speech 
Moby Part-of-Speech contains 233,356 words fully described by part(s) of speech, listed in priority order. The format of the file is word\parts-of-speech, with the following parts of speech being identified:

 Pronunciator 
The Moby Pronunciator II contains 177,267 entries with corresponding pronunciations. Most of the entries describe a single word, but approximately 79,000 contain hyphenated or multiple word phrases, names, or lexemes. The Project Gutenberg distribution also contains a copy of the cmudict v0.3. The file contains lines of the format word[/part-of-speech] pronunciation. Each line is ended with the ASCII carriage return character (CR, '\r', 0x0D, 13 in decimal).

The word field can include apostrophes (e.g. isn't), hyphens (e.g. able-bodied), and multiple words separated by underscores (e.g. ). Non-English words are generally rendered, as stated in the documentation, without accents or other diacritical marks. However, in 36 entries (e.g. ), some non-ASCII accented characters remain, represented using Mac OS Roman encoding.

The part-of-speech field is used to disambiguate 770 of the words which have differing pronunciations depending on their part-of-speech. The parts-of-speech have been assigned the following codes:

Following this is the pronunciation. Several special symbols are present:

The rest of the symbols are used to represent IPA characters. The pronunciations are generally consistent with a General American dialect of English, that exhibits father-bother merger, hurry-furry merger and lot-cloth split, but does not exhibit cot-caught merger or wine-whine merger. Each phoneme is represented by a sequence of one or more characters.

To this collection are added a number of extra sequences representing phonemes found in several other languages. These are used to encode the non-English words, phrases and names that are included in the database. The following table contains these extra phonemes, but note that the extent to which some of these may exist due to encoding errors is not clear.

 Shakespeare 
Moby Shakespeare contains the complete unabridged works of Shakespeare. This specific resource is not available from Project Gutenberg, but it is available in a 1993 version on the web.

 Thesaurus 
The Moby Thesaurus II contains 30,260 root words, with 2,520,264 synonyms and related terms – an average of 83.3 per root word. Each line consists of a list of comma-separated values, with the first term being the root word, and all following words being related terms.

Grady Ward placed this thesaurus in the public domain in 1996.  It is also available as a Debian package although the package has been discontinued starting with Bullseye.

 Words 
Moby Words II is the largest wordlist in the world. The distribution consists of the following 16 files:

 References 

 External links 
Moby Project homepage, University of Sheffield; copy made by the Wayback Machine of the page as it was on 30 September 2017. ("Last modified: October 24, 2000") working download site.
Project Gutenberg downloadsSearching for Rhymes with Perl''; corresponding code
 Wiktionary:Appendix:Moby Thesaurus II

Public domain databases
Corpora
Linguistic research